Team DSM can refer to:

 Team DSM (men's team)
 Team DSM (women's team)
 Development Team DSM